Sofiane Ikene (born 27 February 2005) is a Luxembourger footballer who currently plays as a defender for FC Nürnberg.

International career
Born in Luxembourg, Ikene is of Algerian descent.

He has represented the Luxembourg senior national team, having made his debut in a 2022–23 UEFA Nations League match against Faroe Islands on 14 June 2022.

References

2005 births
Living people
Luxembourgian footballers
Luxembourg youth international footballers
Luxembourg international footballers
F91 Dudelange players
Luxembourgian people of Algerian descent